Mahindra World City, Chengalpattu, Tamil Nadu, is India's first integrated business city. It is a public–private partnership promoted by the Mahindra Group and TIDCO. It is situated near Maraimalai Nagar a southern suburb of Chennai. The city is a part of the Chennai Metropolitan Area.

Etymology
Mahindra World City is located outside Chennai city and was inaugurated on 21 September 2002 by the then Chief Minister of Tamil Nadu J. Jayalalitha. Built on the model of sustainable urbanisation Mahindra World City grew from a bed of business, infrastructure and sustainable practices before evolving into a completely integrated city within a decade of its inauguration.

Geography
Situated on the NH 45, Mahindra World City is located 50 km from Chennai city. It is one of the largest integrated business cities on the Golden Quadrilateral spread over 1,500 acres (6.1 km2). It is surrounded by rolling hills and a reserve forest. Several engineering colleges, educational and technical institutions are located along this corridor around MWC, Chennai.

Economy

The core purpose of the city was building a source of livelihood from which social infrastructure and then residential would evolve. It has drawn businesses from different parts of the globe to set up facilities in India.

Mahindra World City is now a mature business district with leading companies such as Infosys, BMW, Braun, TTK Group, Capgemini, Njmestronics, Renault-Nissan, Tech Mahindra, Wabco, NTN, Husky, Lincoln Electric, Wipro, Timken, cyber vole and TVS Group, parker among others having set up within its premises.

Being one of the largest IT parks in the area along with a host of other industries, more than 25,000 employees have found employment in this zone.

BMW's latest vehicle the 3 Series Gran Turismo was rolled out of their plant in MWC Chennai.

Civic administration

The layout of the city is broken up in to Zones by the utility of the land. There are 3 sector-specific Special Economic Zones (SEZs) - IT (Services and Manufacturing), Auto Ancillaries and Apparel and Fashion Accessories, a Domestic Tariff Area and a Residential / Social zone. Spread across 285 acres, the Residential zone has been planned to provide living spaces supported by modern social infrastructure to over 6,000 families across diverse segments.

The MWC administration operates as the municipal corporation for the city with responsibility for the provision, upkeep and maintenance of the infrastructure and other facilities.

Transport
Mahindra World City is well connected by both road and rail links, with Paranur railway station on site. It is 35 km away from Chennai International Airport and 55 km from Chennai Seaport.

Paranur railway station is a public private partnership initiative between Mahindra World City and Southern Railways. It is the first railway station to be redesigned and maintained by the corporate sector. It was designed by  Architect Sheila Sri Prakash and firm Shilpa Architects.

Mahindra World School
Mahindra World School opened in June 2008. The coeducational school based on the CBSE syllabus is currently functional from classes kindergarten to standard Xll, with 843 students and 65 teachers. The school will cater both to the schooling needs of the children of Mahindra World City employees/residents as well as of those residing in surrounding areas. 
Designed by the architect, Hafeez,  the school is spread over a 5-acre (20,000 m2) campus nestled amidst sylvan surroundings. The school has received the National School Sanitation Award in 2012.

Mahindra Research Valley
Mahindra Research Valley, the key research wing of the Mahindra Group is housed on 125 acres at the Mahindra World City, Chennai, MRV has been designed by Padma Vibhushan, Shri Charles Correa. It is home to over 2500 engineers and designers working in one of the most modern automobile and tractor R&D facilities in India.

Mahindra World City Going II in Chennai
The Mahindra Group has plans to replicate this model of an integrated business city with industrial, residential and social infrastructure at Gummidipoondi in north part of Chennai. The Gummidipoondi facility will cover 1,000 acres (4.0 km2) abutting NH5 will mainly focus on Domestic Tariff Area (DTA). It will also have a logistics park and a residential park.

Mahindra Lifespaces
The Mahindra Group only allows Mahindra housing and Real Estate organizations to carry out construction activities in Mahindra World City.

See also
 Economy of Chennai
 Mahindra World City
 Mahindra World City, Ahmedabad

References

External links
 

Special Economic Zones of India
Industrial parks in India
Economy of Chennai
Mahindra Group